"Heritage" is a song by American band Earth, Wind & Fire featuring Suns of Light (as the Boys), released in February 1990 by Columbia Records as the first single from their fifteenth studio album, Heritage (1990). It reached No. 5 on the US Billboard Hot R&B Singles chart and No. 5 on the Cash Box Top R&B Singles chart.

Overview
"Heritage" was produced by Maurice White and written by White, Lestley Pierce and Frankie Blue. With a duration of four minutes and five seconds the song has a prestissimo tempo of 207 beats per minute.

The single's B-side was a song called "Gotta Find Out". Both "Heritage" and "Gotta Find Out" came upon EWF's 1990 studio album Heritage.

A music video was also issued in 1990 to accompany the single.

Critical reception
May Mitchell of The Chicago Tribune proclaimed that "guest appearances are made by the Boys who lend a nice choral touch to the funky title track". Billboard called "Heritage" "a solid funky jam strong on complex harmonies and prideful lyrics" with "youthful zest". Peter Kinghorn of the Newcastle Chronicle found a "Throbbing dance beat with the Boys helping out on harmonies." John Milward of Rolling Stone declared that the "prideful title tune even throws in the kind of admonition — “This is a party, y’all,” courtesy of the Boys — favored by Earth, Wind and Fire's more radical old rivals in Parliament-Funkadelic". Pablo Guzman of the New York Daily News also exclaimed that EWF "jumps into radioactive with Takin' Chances and Heritage, the latter featuring the Boys. The union is a kicking one".

Credits
Alto Saxophone, Tenor Saxophone – Andrew Woolfolk, Gary Bias
Arranged By – Les Pierce
Arranged By [Horns] – Bill Meyers
Backing Vocals – Philip Bailey
Bass – Verdine White
Featuring [Backing Vocals] – The Boys
Guitar – Frankie Blue
Guitar, Backing Vocals – Sheldon Reynolds
Keyboards, Programmed By [Synthesizer], Drum Programming – Les Pierce
Lead Vocals, Backing Vocals – Maurice White
Trombone – Reggie Young 
Trumpet – Jerry Hey, Oscar Brashear
Written-By – Frankie Blue, Les Pierce, Maurice White

Charts

References

1990 singles
1990 songs
Earth, Wind & Fire songs
Columbia Records singles
New jack swing songs
Songs written by Maurice White
Song recordings produced by Maurice White